Patrick Anthony "Pat" Jansen (14 December 1920 – 23 November 2003) was an Indian hockey player who competed in the 1948 Summer Olympics.

Patrick Anthony Jansen was born in the year 1920. This Indian hockey player competed in the 1948 Summer Olympics. Pat Jansen went to boarding school at St. Joseph's, Nainital from 1932 - 1938. He made his school first XI in hockey, cricket and football. This Olympic Gold medallist, Patrick Anthony Jansen a year after school, joined the Calcutta Port Commissioners. Jansen played hockey for his team and also won the Division I title and Beighton Cup many times.

During the war years, Jansen captained the Bengal team. Jansen was selected in the year 1948, for the Indian Olympic team which beating Britain in the final went on to win the hockey gold. In the London Olympics, Jansen was one of the top goal scorers. Later on Jansen joined Union Carbide International, and retired from playing competitive hockey. Jansen and his family in 1963 migrated to Perth, Australia. He died on 23 November 2001.

External links
 
 Patrick Jansen's profile at databaseOlympics
 Patrick Jansen's profile at Sports Reference.com

1920 births
2003 deaths
Field hockey players from Tamil Nadu
Field hockey players from Kolkata
Olympic field hockey players of India
Field hockey players at the 1948 Summer Olympics
Indian male field hockey players
Anglo-Indian people
Indian emigrants to Australia
Australian people of Anglo-Indian descent
Olympic gold medalists for India
Olympic medalists in field hockey
Medalists at the 1948 Summer Olympics